Drug Dome is a granite dome in the Tuolumne Meadows area of Yosemite National Park. Drug Dome is just west of Fairview Dome. It is also near Mariolumne Dome, Lamb Dome and Medlicott Dome.

Despite Drug Dome's close proximity to the road, it is one of Tuolumne Meadows's more obscure domes. It is a short distance west of Daff Dome and Fairview Dome.

On Drug Dome's particulars

Drug Dome has a few rock climbing routes.

References

External links and references

 On a rock climb on Drug Dome, called Oz
 Another reference, gives directions, to Drug Dome

Granite domes of Yosemite National Park